Heike Balck (born 19 August 1970 in Schwerin) is a retired German high jumper.

Biography
Her personal best jump of 2.01 metres, achieved in June 1989 in Karl-Marx-Stadt, is also the current junior world record. Balck shares the record with Olga Turchak, who cleared the height in 1986.

Achievements

See also
Female two metres club

External links

1970 births
Living people
Sportspeople from Schwerin
People from Bezirk Schwerin
German female high jumpers
20th-century German women